Intelligent Speech Analyser (ISA) is a speech and voice analyzer developed in Finland.

The first presentation of the Intelligent Speech Analyser (ISA) 

The first presentation of the Intelligent Speech Analyser (ISA) developed by Raimo Olavi Toivonen took place in January 1987 at the Finnish Phonetics Meeting at Jyväskylä University. The development work started in 1985 and has continued since then.

Articles whose some results have been obtained using ISA 

In 100 academic theses, 27 of which are academic dissertations, spoken language have been studied with the help of the ISA developed by Toivonen. There are a total of almost 500 publications. Using ISA, 14 spoken and written languages have been researched. These are Finnish, Swedish, Estonian, Icelandic, Hungarian, Polish, Czech, German, Russian, English, French, Greek, Portuguese, and Spanish.

Using ISA, scientific publications were published in the following areas:
 Phonetics,
 Measurement of formants of human voice (F1, F2, F3 und F4),
 Bark Scale Formant Charts of human voice,
 Measurement of the fundamental frequency of human voice (F0),
 Measurement of the sound pressure level of human voice (SPL),
 Measurement of the Computer Voice Field of human voice (CVF),
 Segmentation of the human voice,
 FFT spectrum of human voice,
 FFT spectrogram of human voice,
 FFT spectral series of human voice,
 LPC spectrum of human voice,
 LPC spectrogram of human voice,
 LPC spectral series of human voice,
 Cepstrum of human voice,
 Cepstral series of human voice,
 Auditory spectrum of human voice,
 Auditory spectrogram of human voice,
 Auditory spectral series of human voice,
 Phonetogram of the human voice,
 Jitter, shimmer, S/N ratio of the human voice,
 F0 distribution of the human voice on the semitone scale,
 Measurement of the Long-Term Average Spectrum of human voice (LTAS),
 Alpha ratio of Long-Term Average Spectrum of human voice,
 L0, L1, L2, L3 L4, L1-L0 of Long-Term Average Spectrum of human voice,
 Leq, Equivalent continuous sound level of human voice,
 Speech research on a loudness scale (Sone scale),
 Spectral properties of a good human voice,
 Teacher's voice,
 Radio Speech,
 Emotions in the voice,
 Speech prosody,
 Speaker recognition,
 Speech synthesis by Synte 2 text-to-speech synthesizer, SPL1 research speech synthesizer and ISA,
 Brain research by Synte 2 text-to-speech synthesizer, SPL1 research speech synthesizer and ISA,
 Speech therapy,
 Vocology,
 Phonology,
 Psychoacoustics,
 Phoniatrics,
 Audiology,
 Musical instrument research.

References

External links 

 

Linguistic research software
Phonetics
Phonology